The White Lioness (Original: Den vita lejoninnan) is a crime novel by Swedish writer Henning Mankell, the third in the Inspector Wallander series.

Synopsis
The story itself takes place in 1992. The plot follows two parallel patterns, one during late apartheid South Africa where incumbent president F.W. de Klerk, leader of the Afrikaner minority which is on the brink of losing power to the African majority under the leadership of the ANC, about to end 44 years of suppression by the Broederbond rule. Simultaneously, Detective Chief Inspector Kurt Wallander is investigating a case of a missing female Methodist real-estate agent outside Ystad. Upon the eventual recovery of her body, as well as the discovery of a severed black finger at the crime scene, Detective Chief Inspector Wallander realizes the case has deep roots in the history and current development in South Africa, where it appears that an extremist cell of the Broederbond is about to orchestrate the murder of F W de Klerk by an infamous black assassin, wishing to plunge the country into a long and devastating civil war.

Publication
Mankell, who himself was deeply interested in questions concerning South Africa and its history and who used to reside in the country part-time, released the book in 1993 during the reign of the National Party and the Afrikaner rule.

Adaptation
In 1996, The White Lioness was adapted by Swedish public broadcaster Sveriges Television into a theatrical movie, starring Rolf Lassgård as Wallander.

In 2016, The White Lioness was adapted by the BBC starring Kenneth Branagh as Wallander.

1993 Swedish novels
Apartheid novels
Novels by Henning Mankell
Wallander
Fiction set in 1918
Fiction set in 1992
Novels set in South Africa
Ordfront books
Bank robbery in fiction